KSEI (930 AM) is a radio station broadcasting a conservative talk format. Licensed to Pocatello, Idaho, United States, the station serves the Pocatello, ID area.  The station is owned by Paul Anderson, through licensee Idaho Wireless Corporation. KSEI serves as the flagship station for Idaho State and broadcast football and men's basketball games live.

History 
KSEI's history dates back to 1926, and for many years the station was East Idaho's NBC affiliate.

On August 15, 1947, KSEI increased its power to 5 KW full-time. It had been operating with 1 KW during the day and 250 W at night. Also on that day, KSEI-FM began broadcasting on 96.5 MHz.

KSEI was the dominant Top 40 station in the Pocatello area in the 1970s and into the 1980s.

The station was sold, along with sister station KMGI, by Pacific Empire Radio to Idaho Wireless Corporation in November 2014. The studios were relocated at the same time. The purchase was consummated on July 9, 2015, at a price of $850,000.

On July 27, 2020, KSEI changed their format from oldies to conservative talk, branded as "News Talk KSEI", with programming from Salem Media Group.

References

External links

FCC History Cards for KSEI

SEI
Conservative talk radio
News and talk radio stations in the United States